These are the late night schedules for the four United States broadcast networks that offer programming during this time period, from September 1988 to August 1989. All times are Eastern or Pacific. Affiliates will fill non-network schedule with local, syndicated, or paid programming. Affiliates also have the option to preempt or delay network programming at their discretion.

Legend

Schedule

Saturday

Sunday

By network

ABC

Returning Series
Nightline

CBS

Returning Series
CBS Late Night
CBS News Nightwatch

New Series
The Pat Sajak Show

Not Returning From 1987-88
Top of the Pops

Fox

New Series
Comic Strip Live

Not Returning From 1987-88
The Late Show
The Wilton North Report

NBC

Returning Series
Friday Night Videos
The George Michael Sports Machine
Late Night with David Letterman
Saturday Night Live
The Tonight Show Starring Johnny Carson

New Series
Later With Bob Costas

United States late night network television schedules
1988 in American television
1989 in American television